Ethan Brown may refer to:

 Ethan Brown (journalist) (born 1972), American investigative journalist and author
 Ethan Allen Brown (1776–1852), American jurist 
 Ethan Brown (businessman) (born 1971), American business executive